I Like Your Style is a studio album by the American singer Jermaine Jackson. It was released in 1981 via Motown.

The album peaked at No. 86 on the Billboard 200.

Track listing

Personnel
Jermaine Jackson - vocals, bass, piano, Fender Rhodes organ, Gsi synthesizer, drums, harmonica
David T. Walker, Paul M. Jackson, Jr., Thom Rotella - guitar
"Ready" Freddie Washington, Nathan Watts - bass
Clarence McDonald, Joe Sample - keyboards
Charles Mims Jr., Mike Lang - Fender Rhodes organ
Greg Phillinganes - synthesizer
Ed Greene, Ollie E. Brown - drums
Karen Jackson - vibraphone
Ernie Watts - saxophone
Charles B. Findley, Gary Grant, Gary Herbig, Jerry Hey, Larry Williams - horns
Jerry Hey - horn arrangements
Gayle Levant - harp
Danny Harvey, Karen Jackson, Lathette Brooks, Michelle Jackson - handclaps
Don Peake - rhythm, horn and string arrangement on "Is It Always Going to Be Like This"
Gene Page - string arrangements
Clarence McDonald (tracks: B3), Elliot Willensky (tracks: B5), Jermaine Jackson, Paul M. Jackson, Jr. (tracks: A1, A3, B1, B3), Rita Coolidge (tracks: A4) - rhythm arrangements

References

1981 albums
Jermaine Jackson albums
albums arranged by Gene Page
Motown albums